Heaven Sent  is a 1963 French comedy film directed by Jean-Pierre Mocky. It was entered into the 13th Berlin International Film Festival. The film has been released under the name Heaven Sent in the English speaking world.

Plot
Georges Lachaunaye is a young member of an impoverished family of ancient nobility. His lack of financial means and his disdain for labour make him a thief who helps himself by robbing the collection boxes of churches.

Cast
 Bourvil as Georges Lachaunaye
 Francis Blanche as Chief Insp. Cucherat
 Jean Poiret as Raoul
 Jean Yonnel as Mattieu Lachesnaye, Georges' father
 Jean Tissier as Brigadier Bridoux
 Véronique Nordey as Françoise Lachaunaye
 Bernard Lavalette as the Police Prefect
 Marcel Pérès as Raillargaud (as Marcel Perez)
 Jean Galland as the college principal / the bishop
 Solange Certain as Juliette Lachaunaye, Georges's wife
 Denise Péronne as Aunt Clair
 Roger Legris as the beadle at the church of Saint-Étienne du Mont

References

External links

1963 films
1963 comedy films
French black-and-white films
Films directed by Jean-Pierre Mocky
French comedy films
1960s French-language films
1960s French films